Moraxella canis is a Gram-negative, oxidase-positive bacterium in the genus Moraxella. The organism is considered normal oral flora of cats and dogs, and it is not commonly attributed to infection in healthy humans. However, the organism has been reported to cause sepsis in an immunocompromised individual. Additionally, M. canis was isolated from a dog bite wound in Sweden and from an ulcerated supraclavicular lymph node of a patient.

References

External links
Type strain of Moraxella canis at BacDive -  the Bacterial Diversity Metadatabase
	

Moraxellaceae
Bacteria described in 1993